The Ministry of Finance is the ministry of the federal government of United Arab Emirates which is responsible for public finances. The ministry's objective is to promote fiscal planning and fiscal sustainability of the Federal Government of the United Arab Emirates. The ministry is located in Abu Dhabi and Dubai.

Ministers

See also
 Cabinet of the United Arab Emirates
 Economy of United Arab Emirates
 Central Bank of the United Arab Emirates

References

External links
  (English)

UAE
Government of the United Arab Emirates
Economy of the United Arab Emirates
Government finances in the United Arab Emirates
Government agencies of the United Arab Emirates